Tafheet (تفحيط), or hajwalah (هجولة), (colloquially known as Arab drifting or Saudi drifting), is a type of street racing-like subculture believed to have started in the late 1970s in Saudi Arabia and United Arab Emirates, that involves driving cars that are generally non-modified or factory-setup (sometimes stolen or rented cars) at very high speeds, around , across wide highways throwing the car left and right to mimic the appearance of drifting. In the process,  drivers often drive dangerously close to traffic, barriers, and spectators watching from the roadsides without any protection.

Tafheet driver practice and events are generally seen on the wide sectioned highways of Riyadh, Al-Qassim Province and, less notably, in other parts of Saudi Arabia. In the United Arab Emirates, tafheet are commonly seen on the highways of Abu Dhabi and Dubai, which also feature long straightaways. 

The technique differs from high-speed cornering on tracks as cars drift sideways at high speed and recover with opposite lock. Tafheet practice and events occur with little or no concern for vehicle occupants, other drivers, or spectator safety, as a result there are many fatal accidents.

Culture
Some of the more popular tafheet maneuvers include:

 Axeyat: turning the car 180 degrees from side to another completing a full 360 by starting from the right to the left or opposite, kind of street sweeping
 Harakat Almawt (Death movements): power slides where one must keep the car going on forward in a straight line until the car stops by itself without fixing the steer or going off track
 Sefty: spinning the car a full 360 degrees starting from any side and then spinning the opposite side of the first 360 with a short power slide between
 Ta'geed: spinning the car a full 360 degrees while driving either straight or sideways more than once
 Tanteel: repeatedly creating a power slide and steering it back with opposite lock at high speed , starting with 4 or more power slides and usually concluded with Ta'geed, Sefty, or Axeyat. It is also considered the main maneuver.

Lack of hobbies amongst youth in the country, and lack of interest in the arts by mainstream society, has been cited as the motivation for youths to participate in drifting exhibitions.

The cars are generally stock mid-size or entry-level luxury sedans, such as the Toyota Camry and various Lexus models, minimizing personal cost and repair liability. While there have been instances involving high-end vehicles such as Ferraris and Nissan GT-Rs, these are relatively less common compared to joyriders stealing sedans or compact cars for the purpose of drifting, abandoning them after an event.

SUVs and pickup trucks such as the Toyota Land Cruiser and the Toyota Hilux are sometimes used for this purpose.

Response
Often the police receive reports about high-speed drifting from concerned citizens demanding an arrest because of the risk to public safety. The drifters are rarely caught as the events are organised using an illegal spotter or spotters who use mobile phones to disband the vehicle activity before the police arrive on the scene. Although the police response is rapid, investigations often prove fruitless; generally, the spectators and drivers have left or are dispersing into regular traffic when the police arrive. Videos of tafheet events are often uploaded to the Internet to be seen by the spectators and drivers. Occasionally, police attempt to intercept the drivers but are chased away by both the drivers and spectators.

In March 2014, a 23-year-old Saudi nicknamed "The King of Nazeem Neighborhood" was sentenced to ten years in prison and 1,000 lashes for a series of car drifting and firearms offenses in Riyadh and Al-Qassim Province. The drifter was also banned from driving for life.

To combat this, academies and leagues have since been established by professional racers in the region, in an effort to mitigate illegal street drifting incidents and to educate youths against the dangers of such activities, encouraging them instead to participate in officially sanctioned events.

See also
 Street racing
 Boy racer
 Hoon
 Mat Rempit

Bibliography 

 Abdullah Aldawsari, Investigating 'tafheet' as a Unique Driving Style Behaviour, 2016, Montfort University
Suhasini Ramisetty-Mikler, Abdulkarim Almakadma, Attitudes and behaviors towards risky driving among adolescents in Saudi Arabia, International Journal of Pediatrics and Adolescent Medicine, 2016
Salameh Ahmad Sawalah, Talal M. Abu-Mansour, Nesreen Mosa Al-Salem & Mohammad Luay M. Shaban, Steering speed suspension device (triple "S" device), to prevent burnouts-tafheet phenomena, IASET, 2013
Imed Ben Dhaou, An electronic system to combat drifting and traffic noises on Saudi roads, Institute of Electrical and Electronics Engineers, 2012

Notes

References

Drifting (motorsport)
Hazardous motor vehicle activities
Saudi Arabian culture
Colloquial terms
20th-century neologisms
Arabic words and phrases